James Michael Shannon (born April 4, 1952), is an American Democratic politician from Massachusetts. He served in the U.S. House of Representatives from 1979 to 1985, and later as the Massachusetts Attorney General.

Biography
Shannon was born in Methuen, Massachusetts on April 4, 1952 and grew up in Lawrence.  He graduated from Phillips Academy in 1969 and received his undergraduate degree from Johns Hopkins University in 1973.  He earned a J.D. degree at The George Washington University Law School in 1975 and practiced law in Lawrence.

In 1970 and 1971 Shannon was an intern in the office of Congressman F. Bradford Morse.   From 1973 to 1975 he served on the staff of Congressman Michael J. Harrington. In 1976 he ran for the Massachusetts State Senate, losing the Democratic primary to incumbent William X. Wall by only eight votes.

He was elected to the U.S. House of Representatives in 1978, succeeding Paul E. Tsongas, who ran successfully for the United States Senate.  Shannon was reelected in 1980 and 1982.

In 1981, he was selected to be one of the first Young Leaders of the French-American Foundation.

When Senator Tsongas announced his retirement in 1984, Shannon entered the race to succeed him. He was defeated in the Democratic primary by Lieutenant Governor John F. Kerry, who went on to win the seat. Shannon served out the rest of his term in the House, leaving office in January 1985, at which point he was elected to the Common Cause National Governing Board.

In 1986, he was elected Attorney General of Massachusetts, defeating Edward F. Harrington and serving from 1987 to 1991. He was defeated for re-election in 1990 by Scott Harshbarger in the Democratic primary.

In 2000 Shannon led Bill Bradley's presidential campaign in Massachusetts and was a Bradley delegate to Democratic National Convention.

He was elected president and Chief Executive Officer of the NFPA (National Fire Protection Association) in 2002, and served until 2014.

He became President of the International Electrotechnical Commission on 1 January 2017 for a three-year term.

References

External links
 
 

1952 births
Living people
Massachusetts lawyers
Politicians from Lawrence, Massachusetts
Massachusetts Attorneys General
Phillips Academy alumni
Johns Hopkins University alumni
George Washington University Law School alumni
Democratic Party members of the United States House of Representatives from Massachusetts
Young Leaders of the French-American Foundation